The Annie Award for Best Animated Feature is an Annie Award introduced in 1992, awarded annually to the best animated feature film.

History
In 1998, the award was renamed Outstanding Achievement in an Animated Theatrical Feature, only to revert to its original title again in 2001.

Winners and nominees

1990s

2000s

2010s

2020s

Multiple wins and nominations by studio

See also
 Academy Award for Best Animated Feature
 Golden Globe Award for Best Animated Feature Film
 Annie Award for Best Animated Feature — Independent
 Producers Guild of America Award for Best Animated Motion Picture
 BAFTA Award for Best Animated Film
 Japan Media Arts Festival
 Los Angeles Film Critics Association Award for Best Animated Film
 Animation Kobe
 Tokyo Anime Award
 Washington D.C. Area Film Critics Association Award for Best Animated Feature
 List of animated feature films awards

References

External links 
 Annie Awards: Legacy

Annie Awards
Awards for best animated feature film
Best Animated Feature Annie Award winners
Awards established in 1992
1992 establishments in the United States